The 2011 ICC EAP Trophy Division 2 was played between 2–8 April 2011 in Apia, Samoa. The tournament was a Twenty20 competition. After a round robin group stage of five matches, Samoa easily beat the Philippines in the final, winning the tournament and promotion to Division One.

Group stage

Points table

Matches

Statistics

Most runs
The top five highest run scorers (total runs) are included in this table.

Most wickets
The following table contains the five leading wicket-takers.

Final standings

See also
2012 ICC World Twenty20 Qualifier
World Cricket League EAP region

References

External links

International cricket competitions in Samoa
2012 ICC World Twenty20
2011 in Samoan sport